The Honor 3X is an Android midrange smartphone produced by Honor, a sub brand of Huawei. It was released in December 2013.
Honor 3X  comes with Android 4.2 out of box and runs on Android 4.4 KitKat OS after latest update.

Specifications
Saying about storage , the phone has 2 GB RAM,and has 8GB or 16GB of internal storage. It is connectable using Bluetooth and Wi-Fi. On the display side, it features a 5.5-inch 720x1280 pixels LCD display.It also features Mediatek MT6592 processor.This phone is now discontinued.

References

Android (operating system) devices
Mobile phones introduced in 2013
Huawei mobile phones
Discontinued smartphones